Eric Gonzalez (born September 16, 1995), better known by his stage name Doc Holiday, is a Mexican hip hop musician, rapper, songwriter and record producer. He is best known for his 2013 single "One", which heavily incorporates samples from Three Dog Night's homonymously titled song, "One".

Biography
Originally from Guanajuato, Mexico, Gonzalez moved to Los Angeles as a child. His songwriting career began in 2011 when he approached Maker Studios, which agreed to publish his music. In 2013, he released an EP, "The Leftovers", which failed to chart in the US, but sold over 12,000 copies in Mexico, largely due to the strength of the lead single, "One", which samples heavily the Three Dog Night song "One". The song was produced by Omito Beats.

Discography

Singles

References

1995 births
Living people